Tobacco Road is the second studio album by Seattle-based hip-hop duo Common Market.  It was released on September 9, 2008, via Hyena Records and Massline Media.  The album's title is a reference to the tobacco-producing region of North Carolina.

Production
The album was close to completion in September 2007, but for reasons unrevealed, the album fell apart and the duo lost 15 weeks worth of work.  However, a friend of the group pulled some strings and managed to get them some studio time at London Bridge Studios in Shoreline, WA.  Five days later, a second cut of the album was complete.

Release
In an October 2007 interview on Seattle radio station 107.7 The End, the duo joked that it is scheduled for release "on your mom's 50th birthday."  They later confirmed that it was due in early 2008.  However, the duo had problems securing distribution, despite interest from several of the labels they shopped it to.  Instead, they took a similar approach to the release of their self-titled debut, opting to take out a $3,500 loan to manufacture the album and distribute it through locally owned Massline Media.

In the interim, they released the Black Patch War EP.  With little promotion, the EP caught many fans, friends of the band, and even RA Scion's mother by surprise.  According to RA Scion, the EP was meant to represent "the essence of compromise," meaning they would continue shopping Tobacco Road around on the condition that they would release new material in May.

On June 27, 2008, music website Spin.com released an official track listing, release date, and free mp3 download of the title track.

Track listing

Personnel
 Sabzi – beats, producer
 RA Scion – rhymes

Charts

References

External links
 

2008 albums
Common Market (hip hop group) albums